Mecyclothorax altiusculus is a species of ground beetle in the subfamily Psydrinae. It was described by Britton in 1938.

References

altiusculus
Beetles described in 1938